Grady the Cow ( - July 24, 1961) became famous for being the  cow stuck inside a storage silo on a farm in Yukon, Oklahoma, in 1949.

Silo incident 
On February 22, 1949, Bill and Alyene Mach's six-year-old Hereford cow, Grady, gave birth to a stillborn calf in a small shed next to a silo. Since she was having trouble with the birth, Mach called a veterinarian, D.L. Crump, to help.  Dr. Crump tied Grady to a post so she would hold still. When he was finished taking care of her, she was untied. She then whirled around and started chasing Bill, who jumped on a pile of cottonseed sacks to escape.

Grady dove for the only light in the shed, which was from the small opening to the silo; the opening was only 17 inches wide and 25 and a half inches high. Mach and Dr. Crump looked toward the silo opening and saw a few red hairs clinging to the edge of the heavy steel silo door. Grady was in the silo. The opening could not be made wider because it was encased in steel. Mach did not want to tear down the silo as it was too valuable, nor did he want to slaughter Grady, who was worth over $1,000.

Bill Mach asked for help through his local newspaper, and the response was overwhelming. Mach and his brother received 5,400 letters and 700 telegrams from people from 45 states and Canada and Germany. Phone calls, telegrams and letters all flowed in; curious people started showing up at the Mach farm in cars and even planes. Grady was featured in Life, Time, and newspapers all over the country.

People offered a variety of solutions for getting Grady out of the silo. The suggestions included rigging a pole to swing her out the top of the silo, tunneling under the silo, and bringing an attractive bull to the opening to lure her out. An Air Force officer said he knew of a helicopter that would lift  but it was in San Marcos, Texas. Three days after Grady's leap, Bill Mach got a call from Ralph Partridge, the farming editor of The Denver Post, who told Mach he was coming to Yukon to get Grady out of the silo.

Partridge supervised while a ramp was built from the floor of the silo to the opening. He coated the ramp and the opening with axle grease. Partridge then smeared Grady with 10 pounds of axle grease, and she was outfitted with two heavy halters. Dr. Crumb recommended that Grady be milked before they attempted to pull her out, so J.O. Dickey Jr., Yukon vocational agriculture teacher, went in the silo and milked her. After Grady had been brought up to the opening, Dr. Crumb gave her tranquilizers to make her relax. While men outside the silo pulled on ropes attached to her halters, Partridge and J.O. Dicky Jr., pushed. Grady slid through the opening, and veterinarians stated that she had not been injured during the rescue.

Later life and legacy
Grady was a local celebrity for the rest of her life. The March 7, 1949, issue of Life magazine featured a picture taken from the top of the silo that showed Grady trapped inside it; text at one corner of the picture read, "Imprisoned by the concrete walls of a silo, an Oklahoma cow eyes the tiny opening ... through which she entered and later escaped."

She marched in the Capitol Hill '89ers Parade in Oklahoma City on April 21, 1949. Later that year, she was exhibited at the Oklahoma State Fair. Grady went on to become a mother several times; she had four heifers and two bulls. Tourists regularly came to see her on the Mach farm, and she was such a tourist attraction that Mach put up a sign on Route 66 noting her home. He kept Grady in a special pen by the road.

Grady the cow died on July 24, 1961. The old silo was torn down in 1997, and a regional hospital was built on the site.

Two children's books have been written describing and illustrating the story of Grady the Cow. The first, The Cow in the Silo, was published in 1950 by Wonder Book Company. The second, Grady's In the Silo, won the 2004 Oklahoma Book Award for Children's Literature. The story of Grady has also been featured in a school curriculum for kindergarten through second grade published by the Oklahoma State University Extension Service.

References

External links
 "The Press: Grady & the Postman". Time. March 7, 1949.
 Townsend, Una Belle (2003). Grady's in the Silo. 

1943 animal births
1961 animal deaths
Individual cows
Individual animals in the United States
Canadian County, Oklahoma